Gomphaeschna furcillata is a dragonfly in the genus Gomphaeschna ("pygmy darners"), in the family Aeshnidae ("darner dragonflies"). A common name for Gomphaeschna furcillata is "harlequin darner".
Gomphaeschna furcillata is found in North America. It is native to Canada and the Continental US.

The IUCN conservation status of Gomphaeschna furcillata is "LC", least concern, with no immediate threat to the species' survival. The population is stable.

References

 American Insects: A Handbook of the Insects of America North of Mexico, Ross H. Arnett. 2000. CRC Press.
 Garrison, Rosser W. / Poole, Robert W., and Patricia Gentili, eds. (1997). Odonata. Nomina Insecta Nearctica: A Check List of the Insects of North America, vol. 4: Non-Holometabolous Orders, 551-580.
 Paulson, Dennis R., and Sidney W. Dunkle (1999). A Checklist of North American Odonata including English name, etymology, type locality, and distribution. Slater Museum of Natural History, University of Puget Sound, Occasional Paper no. 56, 88.

External links
NCBI Taxonomy Browser, Gomphaeschna furcillata

Aeshnidae
Insects described in 1839